Walshausen is a German village in the Zweibrücken-Land municipality, in the Südwestpfalz district in the Rhineland-Palatinate. As of December 2020 it had 320 inhabitants. Walshausen is first mentioned in history in 1463.

References

Südwestpfalz